DWCN may refer to:
 DWCN (Cagayan), an FM radio station broadcasting in Tuguegarao, branded as Magik FM
 DWCN (Daet), an FM radio station broadcasting in Daet, branded as Radyo Pilipinas